Zetov, feminine:  Zetova is a surname whose spelling in English may be of two origins: Bulgarian-language surname Зетов/Зетова and Czech-language Zeťov/Zeťová. Both are of the same derivation: Зет in Bulgarian and 
Zeť in Czech mean son-in-law.

Notable people with the surname include:

Antonina Zetova, Bulgarian volleyball player
Helena Zeťová, Czech singer
Ivan Zetov, Bulgarian basketball player
Zlatko Zetov, former head coach of KK Strumica

See also
Zaťovič

Bulgarian-language surnames
Czech-language surnames